The Asia/Oceania Zone was one of three zones of regional competition in the 1999 Fed Cup.

Group I
Venue: Thana City Golf Club, Samutpakarn, Thailand (outdoor hard)
Date: 22–27 February

The ten teams were randomly divided into two pools of five teams to compete in round-robin competitions. The teams that finished first in the pools would play-off to determine which team would partake in the World Group II Play-offs, while the teams that finished last in the pools would be relegated to Group II for 2000.

Pools

Play-off

  advanced to World Group II Play-offs.
  and  relegated to Group II in 2000.

Group II
Venue: Thana City Golf Club, Samutpakarn, Thailand (outdoor hard)
Date: 22–26 February

The seven teams were divided into two pools of three and four. The top two teams from each pool then moved on to the play-off stage of the competition. The two teams that won a match from the play-off stage would advance to Group I for 2000.

Pools

Play-offs

  and  advanced to Group I in 2000.

See also
Fed Cup structure

References

 Fed Cup Profile, Chinese Taipei
 Fed Cup Profile, India
 Fed Cup Profile, Indonesia
 Fed Cup Profile, Thailand
 Fed Cup Profile, South Korea
 Fed Cup Profile, New Zealand
 Fed Cup Profile, China
 Fed Cup Profile, Hong Kong
 Fed Cup Profile, Singapore
 Fed Cup Profile, Kazakhstan
 Fed Cup Profile, Tajikistan
 Fed Cup Profile, Pakistan
 Fed Cup Profile, Fiji

External links
 Fed Cup website

 
Asia Oceania
Sport in Samutpakarn
Tennis tournaments in Thailand